Glucuronamide is a hexose related to glucuronic acid.

References

Hexoses